Denis Vladmirovich Antonov (born Dolgoprudny, Moscow, 17 September 1986) is a Russian rugby union player. He plays as a lock.

He plays for Slava Moscow since 2010/11.

He has 28 caps for Russia, since 2011, with 4 tries scored, 20 points on aggregate. He had his debut at the 24-19 loss to Italy A, at 12 June 2011, in Gloucester, England, for the 2011 Churchill Cup. He was called for the 2011 Rugby World Cup, playing in three games, one of them as a substitute, without scoring. He had his most recent cap at the 25-0 loss to the United States, at 25 June 2016, in Sacramento, in a tour. He has been absent from the national team since then.

References

External links
Denis Antonov International Statistics

1986 births
Living people
Russian rugby union players
Russia international rugby union players
Rugby union locks
Slava Moscow players
Sportspeople from Moscow Oblast